Mahesh Bhupathi and Mark Knowles were the defending champions, but chose not to participate that year.
Daniel Nestor and Nenad Zimonjić won in the final 6–2, 6–3, against Bob and Mike Bryan.

Seeds

Draw

Draw

External links
Draw

Davidoff Swiss Indoors- Men's Doubles
- Doubles, 2009 Davidoff Swiss Indoors